Lina El Arabi (born 11 August 1995) is a French actress of Moroccan heritage.

Biography
El Arabi was born in Choisy-le-Roi, France, in 1995. At age six, she began playing violin at the Choisy-le-Roi conservatory, and at ten, she got involved in theatre work. She later also studied journalism at the Institut pratique du journalisme in Paris.

In 2016, she was cast in the lead role of the television film Ne m'abandonne pas, about a radicalized Muslim teenager.

In 2017, she landed the lead role of Zahira Kazim in Stephan Streker's A Wedding (French: Noces), where she plays a young Belgian-Pakistani girl who is forced by her family into a traditional marriage. El Arabi won the Valois award for best actress at the Angoulême Film Festival.

In 2019, El Arabi had a recurring role in the comedy series Family Business, which was distributed internationally by Netflix.

Selected filmography

References

External links
 

1995 births
Living people
People from Choisy-le-Roi
French people of Moroccan descent
21st-century French actresses
French film actresses